Pagüey River is a river of Venezuela. It is part of the Orinoco River basin.

See also
List of rivers of Venezuela

References

Rivers of Venezuela